Shepard Mosekgwa (born 22 May 1976) is a Botswanan retired footballer.

Born in Selebi-Phikwe, Mosekgwa played as a defender for BDF XI, TAFIC, Orapa Wanderers, Nico United and Jwaneng Comets.

He played for the Botswana national football team between 2002 and 2003, including a substitute's appearance in Botswana's 2003 COSAFA Cup first round 1–0 victory against Namibia.

References

External links

Association football defenders
Botswana footballers
Gilport Lions F.C. players
Botswana international footballers
1976 births
Living people
Botswana Defence Force XI F.C. players